Cunud (also, Cunut and Dzhunut) is a village and municipality in the Shaki Rayon of Azerbaijan.  It has a population of 960.

References 

Populated places in Shaki District